Jenny Rosemary Vaughan  is a British neurologist and co-lead of The Doctors' Association UK. She specialises in movement disorders, with a focus on Parkinson's disease. Alongside her research, Vaughan campaigns to improve justice within healthcare. She was made an Officer of the Order of the British Empire in the 2023 New Year Honours.

Early life and education 
Vaughan grew up in South West England. Her parents were both teachers. As a young person she was passionate about improving access to clean drinking water. She has said that she became interested in a career in medicine after a school trip to Russia. When saving money to attend university, she worked in the kitchen of a mushroom farm. She studied medicine at the University of Nottingham, and specialised in neurology in London. She worked in Imperial College Healthcare NHS Trust and Ealing Hospital.

Research and career 
Vaughan worked on movement disorders and the genetic mutations and associated phenotype causing early-onset Parkinson's disease.

Alongside her academic research, Vaughan is committed to ending injustice. She currently co-leads the "Learn Not Blame” campaign, a Doctors' Association UK campaign to end blame culture within the National Health Service. The campaign, which launched in 2018, looked to empower individual doctors to learn from adverse events and promote a fair environment. She has successfully campaigned to reform the law on gross negligence, and chaired the campaign to overturn the conviction of Mr David Sellu FRCS and worked with many others to draw national and international attention to the case of Dr Hadiza Bawa-Garba. She argued that the trials were racially charged, and showed that most doctors in England experiencing medical manslaughter trials were Black or minority ethnic. In an interview with The BMJ, Vaughan described Just Culture as being the single most important change she would like to see in the NHS as " Patient safety should always come first. We need to bring in a truly just culture so that errors are discussed openly and everyone can learn from mistakes.". Her advocacy for doctor safety resulted delivering an invited lecture tour of Australasia in 2018.  In 2022 she delivered a TEDxNHS talk on reconnecting with hope when things go wrong.

During the COVID-19 pandemic Vaughan campaigned to get proper personal protective equipment and legal protection for healthcare staff. She was made an Order of the British Empire in the 2023 New Year Honours.

Select publications

Personal life 
Vaughan is a Christian. She has two children. She is also an NHS patient and is undergoing treatment for breast cancer. She was born in 1969

References 

Year of birth missing (living people)
Living people
British neurologists
Women neurologists
21st-century British medical doctors
21st-century women physicians
British women medical doctors
Alumni of the University of Nottingham
Members of the Order of the British Empire